"Those Good Old Dreams" is a song by The Carpenters. Its B-side is "When It's Gone (It's Just Gone)", a song released on the Made in America album in 1981.

The song talks of reliving dreams and feelings of romantic love held long ago ("It's a new day for those good old dreams / One by one it seems they're coming true").

Personnel
Karen Carpenter – lead and backing vocals, percussion
Richard Carpenter – backing vocals, keyboards, arrangements
Joe Osborn – bass
Ron Tutt – drums
Paulinho da Costa – percussion 
Tim May – acoustic and electric guitars
Jay Dee Maness – pedal steel guitar
Gayle Levant – harp
Jimmy Getzoff – concertmaster

Charts

Music video
There was a music video shot for this song in 1981. The video is featured on the Carpenters Gold video collection. Footage of their vinyl record Made in America being manufactured at the A&M Records warehouse is shown at the beginning. Karen singing and Richard playing the piano in a room with colorful, empty picture frames is shown during the verses and the final part of the song; during the choruses, a montage of black-and-white childhood photos of Karen and Richard is displayed.

The yellow pant suit that Karen wore in this video would later be worn by the actress Cynthia Gibb when she starred in the title role of the 1989 film The Karen Carpenter Story.

References

External links
 

The Carpenters songs
1981 singles
Songs with lyrics by John Bettis
Songs written by Richard Carpenter (musician)
1981 songs
A&M Records singles